Jean-Julien Rojer and Horia Tecău were the defending champions, but lost in the first round to Jonathan Marray and Adil Shamasdin.

Pierre-Hugues Herbert and Nicolas Mahut won the title, defeating Julien Benneteau and Édouard Roger-Vasselin in the final, 6–4, 7–6(7–1), 6–3. This was the first all-French men's doubles final at Wimbledon.

Due to inclement weather, all first and second round matches were best-of-three sets instead of best-of-five.

Seeds

Qualifying

Draw

Finals

Top half

Section 1

Section 2

Bottom half

Section 3

Section 4

References

External links
 Men's Doubles draw
2016 Wimbledon Championships – Men's draws and results at the International Tennis Federation

Men's Doubles
Wimbledon Championship by year – Men's doubles